Forest Prairie Township is a township in Meeker County, Minnesota, United States.  The population was 869 at the 2000 census.

History

Forest Prairie Township was organized in 1867, and named for the forests and prairies within its borders.

Geography

Forest Prairie Township is located in Township 121 North of the Arkansas Base Line and Range 30 West of the 5th Principal Meridian.

Demographics
As of the census of 2000, there were 869 people, 300 households, and 249 families residing in the township.  The population density was 25.3 people per square mile (9.8/km2).  There were 361 housing units at an average density of 10.5/sq mi (4.1/km2).  The racial makeup of the township was 99.42% White, 0.12% African American, and 0.46% from two or more races.

There were 300 households, out of which 39.0% had children under the age of 18 living with them, 77.0% were married couples living together, 3.0% had a female householder with no husband present, and 17.0% were non-families. 13.3% of all households were made up of individuals, and 5.0% had someone living alone who was 65 years of age or older.  The average household size was 2.90 and the average family size was 3.19.

In the township, the population was spread out, with 28.9% under the age of 18, 6.1% from 18 to 24, 27.3% from 25 to 44, 28.5% from 45 to 64, and 9.2% who were 65 years of age or older.  The median age was 37 years. For every 100 females, there were 109.4 males.  For every 100 females age 18 and over, there were 113.8 males.

The median income for a household in the township was $46,375, and the median income for a family was $49,444. Males had a median income of $32,788 versus $22,083 for females. The per capita income for the township was $17,340.  About 5.2% of families and 7.6% of the population were below the poverty line, including 10.6% of those under age 18 and 4.1% of those age 65 or over.

References

Townships in Meeker County, Minnesota
Townships in Minnesota
Populated places established in 1867
1867 establishments in Minnesota